Joshua Erowoli Orisunmihare Oluwaseun Maja (born 27 December 1998) is a professional footballer who plays as a striker for  club Bordeaux. Born in England, he played one match for the Nigeria national team in 2019.

Maja played youth football with Crystal Palace, Fulham and Manchester City and began his professional career with Sunderland, making 49 appearances and scoring 17 goals. In January 2019, he joined Bordeaux.

Early life
Born in the London Borough of Lewisham to Nigerian parents, he grew up in Pimlico, London. As a youngster he played for the youth teams of Crystal Palace and Fulham, and despite being formally registered with Fulham he spent some time with Manchester City.

Club career

Sunderland

Maja was not offered a scholarship by Manchester City and in March 2015, Fulham reached an agreement with Sunderland for him to sign a two-year scholarship. In May 2016, he signed his first professional contract with the club, penning a three-year deal.

On 21 September 2016, Maja made his professional debut in a 2–1 victory at Queens Park Rangers in the third round of the EFL Cup, replacing Joel Asoro as a substitute for the final 21 minutes. He did not play again that season but did appear on the bench during their Premier League campaign, which ended in relegation.

Maja made his league debut on 16 December 2017, when he came on for James Vaughan at the Stadium of Light, going on to score his side's only goal of the match five minutes subsequently; the game resulted in Sunderland’s first home win of 2017 and against Fulham, his former team during his youth. Manager Chris Coleman spoke positively of Maja afterwards, stating, "I've been very impressed with Josh. He's different, he gives us a big injection of personality". Maja went on to make 17 appearances in the Championship that season, failing to score anymore following his goal against Fulham, with the club suffering a second consecutive relegation, now to League One.

Relegation proved well personally for Maja, as he broke into the side's starting line-up; he went on to score in all of Sunderland's first four games in August, earning him a nomination for Player of the Month. With his contract due to expire at the end of the season, he was offered a contract extension, though he refused, amid reported interest from multiple clubs. His transfer saga was featured as part of the Netflix documentary Sunderland 'Til I Die. Maja went on to leave the club during the January transfer window, at the time, Maja had scored 16 goals in 30 league appearances.

Bordeaux
On 26 January 2019, Maja signed for French Ligue 1 club Bordeaux on a four-and-a-half year contract. He made his league debut on 17 February in a 2–1 home Derby de la Garonne win over Toulouse, starting and playing 67 minutes. On 20 April, he scored his first Ligue 1 goal in a 2–1 loss at Nîmes, but suffered a first-half left-knee injury that ended his season after seven games. On 3 December 2020, again against Nîmes, Maja scored his first professional hat-trick and also provided an assist in a 6–0 win.

Loan to Fulham
On 1 February 2021, transfer deadline day, Maja returned to English football with his former club in his youth, Fulham, now back in the Premier League though in a relegation battle, signing on loan for the remainder of the 2020–21 season. On 14 February, in his first start for the side, he scored both goals in a 2–0 victory at Everton.

Loan to Stoke City
On 31 January 2022, Maja joined Stoke City on loan for the remainder of the 2021–22 season. He made his debut on 5 February 2022, scoring in a 2–0 win against Wigan Athletic in the FA Cup. Maja made 17 appearances, for Stoke, scoring twice as they finished in 14th position.

International career
In August 2019, the Nigeria national team manager Gernot Rohr said he wanted Maja to represent the nation. He made his international debut on 10 September in a 2–2 friendly against Ukraine, replacing Victor Osimhen in added time.

Career statistics

Club

International

References

External links
 
 
 

1998 births
Living people
Footballers from the London Borough of Lewisham
Citizens of Nigeria through descent
English footballers
Nigerian footballers
Nigeria international footballers
Association football forwards
Sunderland A.F.C. players
FC Girondins de Bordeaux players
Fulham F.C. players
Stoke City F.C. players
English Football League players
Ligue 1 players
Premier League players
Ligue 2 players
English expatriate footballers
Nigerian expatriate footballers
Expatriate footballers in France
English expatriate sportspeople in France
Nigerian expatriate sportspeople in France
Black British sportspeople
English people of Nigerian descent